Will Wright (born 4 July 1973) is a Welsh racing cyclist, he has twice represented Wales in the Commonwealth Games, and is also the proprietor of the Stockport based cycle retailer.

Will began cycling in his early teens, joining 'Manchester Velo' on their weekly club runs each Sunday, but only once he had completed his paper round. The nickname given to him then was Willie Feet due to his unusually large feet.

After finishing his secondary education, Will went to work for 'Marple Cyclesport'. Having gained some success whilst racing, Wright was selected to represent Wales at the Commonwealth Games in Victoria, British Columbia, Canada in 1994. It was there at the Games that Wright rode his first track competition, having never before ridden the track. He competed in the Games once more, closer to home in Manchester in 2002, but unfortunately fell during the men's points race final after hitting a fallen rider; footage of which can be seen on the BBC Motion Gallery.

Will took over 'Bardsley Cycles' at 482 Manchester Road, Stockport, Greater Manchester in the 1990s, which was subsequently renamed 'Will's Wheels' which also sponsors it's eponymous cycling club, 'Will's Wheels Cycling Club'. As well the cycling club, Will's Wheels supports local cycle races by providing prizes which Wright himself has been known to present
Will retired from competitive cycling to spend time with daughters Emily and Megan, and wife Sarah.

Palmarès

1996
3rd Stage 1, Thwaites Grand Prix/Tour of Lancashire
2002
4th Team Pursuit, 4m25.029, Commonwealth Games (with Paul Sheppard, Huw Pritchard & Joby Ingram-Dodd)
2005
2nd Welsh National Road Race Championships

References

1973 births
Living people
Welsh male cyclists
Welsh track cyclists
Commonwealth Games competitors for Wales
Cyclists at the 1994 Commonwealth Games
Cyclists at the 2002 Commonwealth Games
Place of birth missing (living people)